Shabir Ahmad Shah popularly known as Shabir Shah (born 14 June 1953), in Kadipora, Anantnag, Kashmir is the founder and president of the Jammu and Kashmir Democratic Freedom Party (JKDFP), one of the main separatist political organizations seeking "right of self-determination" to Jammu and Kashmir. Having spent 32 years of his life in jails, he is known as the "Jail Bird", "Nelson Mandela of Kashmir" and recognised by Amnesty International as "The Prisoner of Conscience."

Birth and childhood
Born in a business family of South Kashmir's Kadipora town in district Anantnag on 14 June 1953. Shabir Ahmad Shah Varrier did his early schooling at Government Middle School, Sarnal, Anantnag and passed a higher secondary examination from M.I. Higher Secondary School, Anantnag but could not continue his studies due to affiliation with various students’ leagues for which was jailed at very early age.

Shah's father was Ghulam Mohammad Varrier, who was a Block Development Officer. He apparently died in police custody in 1989.

Personal life
Shabir is married to Bilquies Shah, a doctor by profession, and they have two daughters - Sehar Shabir shah and Sama Shabir shah.

In December 2021, it was reported that Shah was "gravely ill" in prison.

Political career

Men’s League to People’s League 

Shah's political career began in 1968 when at the age of 14, he led a demonstration against the Indian government in Kashmir following which he was arrested and was kept in police lockup for three months. Soon Shabir Shah and his colleagues formed the Young Men's League. He along with the league activists were arrested time and again which affected Shah's education.

During his confinement in Central Jail Srinagar, Shah met several resistance leaders including Nazir Ahmad Wani (Al-Fateh), Abdul Majid Pathan (Youth League), Altaf Khan alias Azam Inquilabi (Students Islamic Organization) and other leaders like Ghulam Qadir Hagroo with whom he discussed future plans for fighting for the right to self-determination. While Shabir Shah was still in jail, his associates Nazir Ahmad Wani, S. Hamid, Fazal Haq Qureshi, Abdul Majid Pathan and others formed the Jammu and Kashmir People's League on 3 October 1974, with Nazir Ahmad Wani as its chairman and Abdul Majid its General Secretary. This newly formed organization tool strong exception to the Indra-Abdullah Accord (1975) and organized rallies throughout the State.

Formation of Jammu and Kashmir Democratic Freedom Party 
In 1998, Shah formed Jammu and Kashmir Democratic Freedom Party (JKDFP) that advocates about Self determination of Kashmiri people.

Imprisonment 

Shabir Shah was arrested for the first time in 1968, when he was aged 14, for organizing and leading a student demonstration to press the demand for what he claimed as the "right of self-determination" for the people of Kashmir. He was arrested and jailed for 3 months and 15 days in Srinagar's Central Jail, thus began his jail journey and has been in and out of jail and under house arrest ever since. Immediately after his release, he resumed his political activities by forming Young Men's League along with his colleagues for which he was arrested at Anantnag and was detained for 8 months in Srinagar's Central Jail. After he was released, he was arrested again in 1971 on the allegation of being a core pro-Pakistan activist and was detained without in the district police lines at Anantnag for 7 months.

In 1972, Shah organized demonstrations in Jammu and was arrested under the Defence of Indian Rules Act (DIR) and detained in Central Jail, Srinagar for eleven months. During this period, the political scenario of sub-continent was going through a new metamorphosis as Pakistan had split into two and a new state, Bangladesh had emerged. After his release, Shah addressed a rally at Anantnag, demanding freedom for the Kashmiri people and denounced all decisions and agreements like the Shimla Agreement. As a result of it, he was arrested again in May 1973, just five months after his release and subsequently shifted to the Srinagar's Central Jail where he was detained for another 9 months.

In 1975, Shah denounced the Indira-Abdullah Accord signed by the then Indian Prime Minister Indira Gandhi and Sheikh Muhammad Abdullah. He was arrested for 4 months and subsequently confined in Central Jail, Srinagar for another 30 months. After his release in 1978, Shah immediately began his underground political activities.

In 1980, Shah was re-arrested. He was kept in the sub-jail Kathua and later moved to Central Jail in Srinagar where he was kept for twelve months. He was released towards the end of 1981 but in early 1982 when the People's League launched the Quit Kashmir Movement, he was re-arrested. There were massive demonstrations against his arrest. Life in the valley came to standstill for 5 days. Shah was later released. However, he was re-arrested from the Kailash Hotel and kept in the Kothi Bagh interrogation centre for three and a half months and was kept for another twelve months in Srinagar's Central Jail. Then he was released in 1983. During an international cricket match in Srinagar in October 1983, Shabir Shah led protests against the government and was arrested again in 1984.

When Shah was released in 1986, his health had deteriorated and within hours of his release, he addressed a press conference and demanded that the Kashmiri people be given what he calls the "right of self-determination".

Between April 1988 and August 1989, Shabir Shah remained underground. But, in 1989, Shah was arrested with a militant in Ramban area of the Jammu-Srinagar national highway.

In 2015 Shah was put under house arrest.

On 21 May 2017 it was known that Shabir Ahmad Shah had resigned as Secretary General of the pro-freedom group, Tehreek-e-Hurriyat led by Syed Ali Shah Geelani.

In 2020, during the COVID-19 outbreak, Shah's wife said that he has been in jail for 33 years, so the other people can stay indoor.

Support for Shabir Ahmad Shah
In 1994, Amnesty International condemned the imprisonment of Shah via AI INDEX: ASA 20/WU 13/94 and demanded his release claiming that Shah was illegally imprisoned under the TADA Act.

In 2021, a Chicago-based organisation Justice for All, started the #FreeShabirShah campaign, claiming that Shah has served 35 years in prison without any conviction and suffering from hypertension, diabetes, and heart disease.

The Amnesty International also condemned the imprisonment of Shah claiming his detention is a Human Rights violation and abuse of the Law.

References

Further reading
 

Amnesty International prisoners of conscience held by India
People from Jammu and Kashmir
Living people
1953 births
Jammu and Kashmir politicians
Jammu and Kashmir Democratic Freedom Party politicians
Indian prisoners and detainees